Kang Kyung-jin (Hangul: 강경진; Hanja: 姜京珍; born 24 March 1973) is a former badminton player and coach from South Korea. He was the men's doubles champion at the 1997 All England Open and 1998 Asian Championships. He competed at the 1996 Summer Olympics.

Early life 
The left-handler Kang Kyung-jin, began to play badminton when he was in the third grade of Dongdaegu Elementary School, recognized by his teacher who is also a badminton coach in a club. In the beginning, he wants to be a baseball player, following his father who was also a baseball player.

Career 
As a player, Kang was best known for winning the 1997 All England Open men's doubles title with Ha Tae-kwon. In the same year, Kang and Ha also won major titles at the Swedish Open and the Korea Open and the following year, they won the Badminton Asia Championships. In the 1994 Asian Games, he won two silver medals, in mixed doubles and in the men's team event.

Coach 
Kang graduated from Inha University, and after that he started his career as a coach in Gangnam-gu office team. He later was selected to join the national team as men's doubles coach in 2003, and took part at the Summer Olympics from 2004–2016, with his best achievements was managed to lead Ha Tae-kwon and Kim Dong-moon to win a gold medal in 2004. He spent one year as the head coach of the national junior team, and then Kang was named as the head coach of the senior national team in December 2016, with his term to run from 1 January 2017 to 30 October 2018. Following the Korean team's disappointing results at the 2018 Asian Games, Kang with some of Korean coaching staff were fired by the Badminton Korea Association (BKA). In September 2019, he was hired to join Chinese national team coaching staff, and made a history in China badminton as the first foreign coach on their team.

Personal life 
Kang wife, Park Soo-yun, is also a former badminton player.

Achievements

World Championships 
Mixed doubles

Asian Games 
Mixed doubles

Asian Championships 
Men's doubles

Mixed doubles

Asian Cup 
Mixed doubles

East Asian Games 
Men's doubles

IBF World Grand Prix 
The World Badminton Grand Prix sanctioned by International Badminton Federation (IBF) since 1983.

Men's doubles

Mixed doubles

IBF International 
Men's doubles

Men's doubles

References 

1973 births
Living people
South Korean male badminton players
Badminton players at the 1996 Summer Olympics
Olympic badminton players of South Korea
Badminton players at the 1994 Asian Games
Badminton players at the 1998 Asian Games
Asian Games silver medalists for South Korea
Asian Games bronze medalists for South Korea
Asian Games medalists in badminton
Medalists at the 1994 Asian Games
Medalists at the 1998 Asian Games
Inha University alumni
Badminton coaches
World No. 1 badminton players